The destroyer HNoMS Troll, known locally as Torpedojager Troll (litt.: torpedo hunter), was the second destroyer built for the Royal Norwegian Navy, as the second ship of the Draug-class destroyers. She was built at the naval shipyard in Horten, with yard number 104. She was kept in service long after she was obsolete, and took part in the defence of Norway after the German invasion in 1940.

Norwegian Campaign
On 9 April Troll was stationed at Måløy, as part of the 2nd Naval District's 1st destroyer division. Commanded by Captain J. Dahl the vessel operated in the Sognefjord after the German invasion.

As the forces in the Sognefjord naval district started surrendering 1 May Troll was ordered to sail to the UK, but due to a lack of coal the ship was unable to do so. Hence, she struck her flag in Florø on 4 May 1940. Her crew joined the Norwegian land forces. The abandoned ship was found and seized in Florø by the Germans on 18 May.

German service
After capture Troll, retaining its original name, was rebuilt by the Germans as a distillation vessel and steam supply ship, having her whole superstructure removed. She was used as such at the Laksevåg shipyard near Bergen from 1941 until she was returned to the Royal Norwegian Navy in 1945.

Post-war
Although Troll survived the war years and was returned to her proper owners, she was by then too worn down to see further service and was sold for scrapping in 1949.

References

Literature

External links
 Naval History via Flix: KNM Draug, retrieved 29 January 2006 

Draug-class destroyers
Naval ships of Norway captured by Germany during World War II
Ships built in Horten
World War II destroyers of Norway
World War II distilling ships
1910 ships